Rakesh Tikait (born 4 June 1969) is a  national spokesperson of the Bharatiya Kisan Union (BKU) from Uttar Pradesh, India.

Early life 
Tikait was born on 4 June 1969 in Sisauli town of Muzaffarnagar, Uttar Pradesh. He is the son of a prominent farmer leader and BKU co-founder late Mahendra Singh Tikait. His eldest brother is Naresh Tikait, who is the National President of the BKU.

Career 
Tikait graduated with an M.A. degree from Meerut University and then did LLB after that. He joined Delhi Police in 1992, as constable then Sub Inspector, but left Delhi police in 19931994. After leaving the police, he joined the BKU. After the death of his father, Tikait officially joined BKU and later became its spokesperson. In 2018, Tikait was the leader of Kisan Kranti Yatra from Haridwar, Uttrakhand to Delhi. Tikait had contested the 2007 UP Assembly elections from the Khatauli seat as a candidate of the Bahujan Kisan Dal (BKD) party (with Congress support), only to finish a distant sixth. In the 2014 Indian general election, he fought on a Rashtriya Lok Dal ticket from Amroha Lok Sabha constituency.

2020-21 Farmers protest 
In November 2020, his organization BKU joined the 2020–2021 Indian farmers' protest, demanding declaration of MSP as a legal right, exclusion of farmers from the law to curb pollution to allow burning of crops (consensus to which was reached during the sixth round of talks between the Centre and Farmer Union) and removal of the farm bills."Our biggest concern is that operations in mandis and outside would be different. While mandis would levy taxes, there would be no tax or market fee outside. The government is not abolishing the Agricultural Produce Market Committees directly. However, the mandi system enables an assured minimum support price, which will collapse gradually" said Rakesh Tikait. After violence broke out in the National Capital on 26 January (Republic Day), Delhi Police filed an FIR against Rakesh Tikait and a few other farmer leaders for their role in inciting violence on Republic Day and breach of the NOC issued by Delhi Police.

References 

1969 births
People from Muzaffarnagar district
Indian farmers
Farmers' rights activists
Living people
Indian politicians
Leaders of 2020–2021 Indian farmers' protest